Bear Creek is a stream in Bollinger and Wayne counties in the U.S. state of Missouri. It is a tributary of the Castor River.

The stream headwaters are in northern Wayne County southeast of Coldwater and the confluence with the Castor River is in western Bollinger County northwest of the community of Gipsy.

Bear Creek was so named on account of bears in the area.

See also
List of rivers of Missouri

References

Rivers of Bollinger County, Missouri
Rivers of Wayne County, Missouri
Rivers of Missouri